The 1990 Federation Cup was the 28th edition of the most important competition between national teams in women's tennis. The tournament was held at the Peachtree World of Tennis in Peachtree Corners (then unincorporated Gwinnett County), GA, United States, from 21–29 July.  The United States defeated the Soviet Union in the final, giving the USA their 14th and 2nd consecutive title.

Qualifying rounds
All ties were played at the Peachtree World of Tennis in Peachtree Corners, GA, United States, on hard courts.

Pre-qualifying

Winning nations advance to Main Qualifying, losing nations play in Consolation Qualifying round.

Chinese Taipei vs. Bahamas

Malta vs. Sri Lanka

Philippines vs. Trinidad and Tobago

Main Qualifying

Winning nations advance to Main Draw, losing nations play in Consolation Qualifying round.

Chinese Taipei vs. Venezuela

South Korea vs. Luxembourg

Dominican Republic vs. Thailand

China vs. Mexico

Hong Kong vs. Malaysia

Israel vs. Ireland

Indonesia vs. Yugoslavia

Finland vs. Jamaica

Denmark vs. Norway

Poland vs. Uruguay

Greece vs. Malta

Bulgaria vs. Philippines

Main draw

1st Round losing teams play in Consolation Rounds

First round

United States vs. Poland

Sweden vs. Belgium

Australia vs. Indonesia

South Korea vs. Czechoslovakia

Italy vs. Finland

Dominican Republic vs. Great Britain

Japan vs. China

Bulgaria vs. Austria

Germany vs. Argentina

Netherlands vs. Switzerland

Hong Kong vs. Hungary

Brazil vs. Soviet Union

New Zealand vs. Greece

France vs. Chinese Taipei

Israel vs. Denmark

Canada vs. Spain

Second round

United States vs. Belgium

Australia vs. Czechoslovakia

Italy vs. Great Britain

Japan vs. Austria

Germany vs. Netherlands

Hong Kong vs. Soviet Union

New Zealand vs. France

Israel vs. Spain

Quarterfinals

United States vs. Czechoslovakia

Great Britain vs. Austria

Netherlands vs. Soviet Union

France vs. Spain

Semifinals

United States vs. Austria

Soviet Union vs. Spain

Final

United States vs. Soviet Union

Consolation

Qualifying round

Winning teams advance to Consolation Main Draw

Uruguay vs. Thailand

Philippines vs. Jamaica

Norway vs. Malta

Luxembourg vs. Sri Lanka

Mexico vs. Trinidad and Tobago

Ireland vs. Malaysia

Yugoslavia vs. Bahamas

Main draw

First round

South Korea vs. Indonesia

Philippines vs. Venezuela

Greece vs. Yugoslavia

Norway vs. Bulgaria

Ireland vs. Chinese Taipei

Dominican Republic vs. Poland

Uruguay vs. China

Denmark vs. Luxembourg

Second round

Canada vs. Indonesia

Mexico vs. Venezuela

Switzerland vs. Yugoslavia

Brazil vs. Bulgaria

Chinese Taipei vs. Finland

Poland vs. Argentina

China vs. Hungary

Luxembourg vs. Sweden

Quarterfinals

Indonesia vs. Mexico

Switzerland vs. Brazil

Finland vs. Argentina

Hungary vs. Luxembourg

Semifinals

Indonesia vs. Switzerland

Argentina vs. Hungary

Final

Indonesia vs. Hungary

References

Billie Jean King Cups by year
Federation
Tennis tournaments in the United States
Sports competitions in Atlanta
1990 in women's tennis
1990 in American tennis
1990 in sports in Georgia (U.S. state)
July 1990 sports events in the United States